William Davis House may refer to:

William Charles Davis House, Safford, Arizona, listed on the NRHP in Graham County, Arizona
William Morris Davis House, Cambridge, Massachusetts, listed on the NRHP in Middlesex County, Massachusetts
William and Anna Davis House, Gainesville, Texas, listed on the NRHP in Cooke County, Texas

See also
Davis House (disambiguation)